Itaporanga is a municipality in the state of São Paulo in Brazil. The population is 15,173 (2020 est.) in an area of 508 km². The elevation is 589 m. This place name comes from the Tupi language and means "beautiful stone" (itá = "stone", porang = "beautiful").

References

Municipalities in São Paulo (state)